The Tallapoosa darter (Etheostoma tallapoosae) is a species of freshwater ray-finned fish, a darter from the subfamily Etheostomatinae, part of the family Percidae, which also contains the perches, ruffes and pikeperches. It is endemic to the eastern United States, where it occurs above the Fall Line in the Tallapoosa River system in Georgia and Alabama. It inhabits bedrock pools and rocky riffles of creeks and small rivers.

References

Tallapoosa darter
Fish of the Eastern United States
Freshwater fish of the United States
Endemic fauna of the United States
Tallapoosa darter
Tallapoosa darter
Tallapoosa darter